City class may refer to:

 , the Halifax-class frigate of the Royal Canadian Navy
 , the "Pook Turtles", aka Eads gunboats
 , the mine countermeasures vessel under construction for the Belgian and Dutch navies
 Global Combat Ship a design of frigate under construction, to be called the Type 26 or "City class" when introduced to the British Royal Navy
 GWR 3700 Class locomotives, nicknamed "City class"

See also
 Town class (disambiguation)
 GWR Metropolitan Class
 Province class (disambiguation)